Van Buchem disease, or hyperostosis corticalis generalisata, is an autosomal recessive skeletal disease which is characterised by uninhibited bone growth, especially in the mandible, skull and ribs.

The disease was first described in 1955 by Prof. Franciscus Stephanus Petrus van Buchem, when describing two patients of the same family in Urk in the Netherlands. The cause, he found, was that the bone was produced faster than the body broke it down, making it much thicker as the patient got older. The first symptoms experienced by the affected were often deafness and paralysis of the face, caused by the growing bone pinching the nerves. This condition can be traced to a deletion on chromosome 17q. As the disease is recessive, a child will only be affected by the disease if both of the parents are carriers and the child is homozygous for the allele, meaning that they have the allele in duplicate. The gene involved is SOST, and by extension the protein involved is sclerostin. There have been attempts to relieve a patient suffering from van Buchem disease: "A large bilateral frontoparietal craniotomy and decompression of the foramen magnum resulted in almost complete relief of his symptoms."


Urk 

There are fewer than 30 confirmed patients known to suffer from this disease; 22 of them are from the Netherlands and 14 are from Urk. Whilst previously an island in the Zuiderzee, in 1942 the land was reclaimed. However, the residents still remained a closed community, and the centuries of isolation have led to a consequence in almost exclusive intermarriage. This has increased the risk of certain hereditary disorders such as Van Buchem's and has promoted several hereditary characteristics within Urk.

References

External links 
 Van Buchem Disease in the Online Mendelian Inheritance in Man (OMIM)

Skeletal disorders